Paydiant, Inc. is a PayPal-owned financial services company based in Auburndale, Massachusetts, which was incorporated in 2010. Paydiant provides cloud-based services for merchants, banks, and point-of-sale and ATM providers.

History
In 2011, Paydiant raised $7.6 million funding from North Bridge Venture Partners and General Catalyst Partners. 

Paydiant received a funding of $12 million and $15 million in 2012 and 2013 respectively.

Paydiant has provided mobile wallet platforms for MCX. In 2015, PayPal acquired Paydiant in a $280 million deal.

References

External links

PayPal
Mobile payments
Electronic funds transfer
Financial services companies established in 2010
Online financial services companies of the United States
2015 mergers and acquisitions
Companies based in Middlesex County, Massachusetts
Newton, Massachusetts
2010 establishments in Massachusetts